Gauthier Grumier (born 29 May 1984, in Nevers) is a French left-handed épée fencer.

Grumier is a three-time team European champion, 2015 individual European champion, and five-time team world champion.

A two-time Olympian, Grumier is a 2016 team Olympic champion and 2016 individual Olympic bronze medalist.

Career
Grumier won the gold medal in the épée team event at the 2006 World Fencing Championships after beating Spain in the final. He accomplished this with his teammates Érik Boisse, Ulrich Robeiri and Fabrice Jeannet.  He was also part of the French teams that won in 2010, 2011 and 2014.  He won the silver medal in the individual épée event at the 2010 World Fencing Championships and at the 2015 World Fencing Championships.

Grumier competed in the 2012 London Olympic Games and the 2016 Rio de Janeiro Olympic Games.

He began fencing at the age of 3, taken along to training sessions by his father who was a fencing coach.

Medal Record

Olympic Games

World Championship

European Championship

Grand Prix

World Cup

References

1984 births
French male épée fencers
Living people
Place of birth missing (living people)
Fencers at the 2012 Summer Olympics
Fencers at the 2016 Summer Olympics
Olympic fencers of France
Olympic gold medalists for France
Olympic bronze medalists for France
Olympic medalists in fencing
Medalists at the 2016 Summer Olympics
Mediterranean Games gold medalists for France
Mediterranean Games medalists in fencing
Competitors at the 2005 Mediterranean Games
People from Nevers
Sportspeople from Nièvre